Alexander V (c. 1703/4 – March 1752), of the Bagrationi Dynasty, was King of Imereti (western Georgia) from 1720 his death in 1752, with the exceptions of the periods of 1741 and 1746–1749.

Reign 
The eldest son of George VII of Imereti and Princess Rodam of Kartli, Alexander was brought up at the court of Vakhtang VI of Kartli and enjoyed his support in the power struggle in Imereti. He visited Istanbul in the 1710s in order to seek Ottoman aid against the Gurieli usurpers of the crown of Imereti. In August 1719, he returned with a detachment of Turkish auxiliaries, deposed George VIII Gurieli in June 1720, and was crowned king of Imereti. However, from 1721 to 1728, the government was effectively run by Bezhan Dadiani, Prince of Mingrelia. When Alexander assumed full ruling powers, Bezhan's son and successor Otia defied him and his pro-Turkish policy, and attempted to remove Alexander from the throne. Alexander managed to force him into submission in 1732 and brought, for the time being, a feudal anarchy to an end.

In the early 1730s, the king effectively withdrew his loyalty from the Ottomans, refused to accept the Persian suzerainty and attempted to make an alliance with the Russian Empire. In 1738, he sent Bishop Timothy Gabashvili to St. Petersburg with a plan of joint actions against the Ottomans. However, the 1739 Russo-Turkish Treaty of Belgrade rendered the mission abortive. Indignant at his diplomacy in Russia, the Ottomans sponsored a coup that deposed Alexander in favor of his brother George IX. The Persian ruler Nadir Shah quickly took Alexander's side and protested to the Ottoman government. In 1742, Alexander was restored, but faced a revolt, in 1746, by his brother Mamuka who ruled as a rival king in parts of Imereti until the fratricide war ended in Alexander's victory in 1749. Yet, the general instability and occasional outbreaks of aristocratic disobedience continued to trouble the rest of Alexander's reign.

Family 
Alexander was married twice. He married firstly, in 1721, Mariam (died 1731), daughter of Bezhan Dadiani, Prince of Mingrelia, and secondly, in 1732, Tamar (died 1772), daughter of Prince Levan Abashidze. Alexander had six sons and two daughters:
 Princess Khoreshan, born of Alexander's union with Mariam Dadiani. She was married to Prince Nikoloz Tsereteli (1722–1772)
 Prince Narin-David (c. 1727–1749), born by Mariam Dadiani.
 Princess Rodam (died 1770), born by Mariam Dadiani, who married, in 1732, Prince Mamia IV Gurieli (died 1784).
 Solomon I (1735 – 23 April 1784), born of Alexander's union with Tamar Abashidze, King of Imereti (1752–1766, 1768–1784).
 Prince Ioseb (1739–1776), born by Tamar Abashidze, Catholicos of Abkhazia (1769–1776).
 Prince Bagrat (1741–1800), born by Tamar Abashidze. Bagrat's progeny, through his son David, is the longest surviving line directly descending from the kings of Imereti.  
 Prince Archil (died 1775), born by Tamar Abashidze. He was father of Solomon II of Imereti, the last king of Imereti. 
 Prince Giorgi (fl. 1748).

References 

 Вахушти Багратиони (Vakhushti Bagrationi) (1745). История Царства Грузинского: Жизнь Имерети.
David Marshall Lang, The Last Years of the Georgian Monarchy, 1658-1832. New York: Columbia University Press, 1957.

1703 births
1752 deaths
Bagrationi dynasty of the Kingdom of Imereti
Kings of Imereti
18th-century people from Georgia (country)
Eastern Orthodox monarchs